The National Statistical Institute or NSI ( or НСИ) is the Bulgarian state agency responsible for the collection and dissemination of statistical data on the population, economy and environment of the country. It reports directly to the Prime Minister of the country.
The National Statistical Institute was established in 1880 as a Department of the Ministry of Finance. It carried out the first census of the population in 1881. In 1894, the Department becomes part of the Ministry of Trade and Agriculture. In 1910, the agency published its first annual statistical report, "Statistical Yearbook of the Kingdom of Bulgaria".

Historical Review 

1880  A Statistical Division was established at the Ministry of Justice (21 January 1880 )

1880  A Statistical Organizational Division was formed at the Ministry of Finance (June 25, 1880)

1880  The beginning of the Population censuses in Principality of Bulgaria was established with the Law of 13 December 1880

1881  The first Population census was conducted  on 1 January 1881

1881  The Bulgarian Official Statistical Office was created. The Statistical Division turned into independent Statistical Office

1896  The first Census of the  Civil Servants was conducted

1897  A Law on the Statistics Directorate in the Principality of Bulgaria and a Law on Population Census, Housing and Livestock

1897  For the first time a Census of Land Property in Bulgaria was conducted

1907  A Law on the Statistics Directorate General in the Bulgarian Kingdom

1908  Issued a publication “Monthly Statistical Reviews “

1909  The first Census in Industry was carried out

1910  Published the first Statistical Yearbook

1925  Conducted the first Household Budgets Survey

1926  The first General Economic Census was conducted, together with the Population Census during the same year. For first time in

Europe a sampling method for quick aggregation of the results from General Agricultural Farms Census was used

1929  The first specialized magazine of the Statistics Directorate General started. Nowadays it comes out under the name of “Statistics Journal”

1934  The agricultural survey was carried out  with using a sample method for the first time in the data collection phase

1946  A Law on the Organization of Statistics in Bulgaria -The Statistics Directorate General passed over to the Council of Ministers.  A network of local statistical bodies was created for the first time

1953  A Central Statistical Office at the Council of Ministers as a state authority to manage the overall statistical activity in the country was created

1991  A Law on Statistics  – the National Statistical Institute (NSI) was created

1993  A Common Declaration of Statistical Cooperation between  the National Statistical Institute of the Republic of Bulgaria and of the Statistical Office of the European  Communities (Eurostat) was signed

1999  Worked out a Law on Statistics in compliance with EC legislation

2000  A Law on Population, Housing Fund and Agricultural Holdings Census in the Republic of Bulgaria - 2001

2000  For the first time a Strategy for development of statistics till 2006 was worked out  and adopted by the National Statistical Council

2000  Closed the EU negotiations on Chapter 12 Statistics

2001  A Global assessment of the National Statistical System was carried out by the Eurostat

2003  Bulgaria officially joined the IMF Special Data Dissemination Standard

2006  A Law on Statistics of intra - community trade in goods

2007  The Bulgarian Statistics was integrated into the European Statistical System

2007  A Peer review on the implementation of the European Statistics Code of Practice concerning improvement quality of statistical information and confidence in statistics

2008  A  Strategy for Development of the National Statistical System of the Republic of Bulgaria, 2008 – 2012

2008  The Law on Statistics was amended in compliance with the Regulation (EC) No 223/2009 of the  European Parliament and of the Council of 11 March 2009 on European statistics

2009  Census Law on  Population and Housing  in the Republic of Bulgaria - 2011

Management 

1880-1884 Michael Sarafoff Head of Statistics Department from 1.08.1880 to 4.27.1884 year

1884-1886 Peter Kalinkov manager (director) of the Statistical Office of 1.08.1884 to 1.27.1886 year

1886-1893 Ivan Slavov, director of the Statistics Bureau of 6.02.1886 to 12.15.1893 year

1893-1899 Todor Ivanchov director of the Statistics Bureau of 12.23.1893 to 01.18.1899 years (from 1897 - Director of Statistics)

1899 Nicola Imaretski managing Directorate statistics from 01.18.1899 to 04.14.1899 year

1899 Raycho Karolev a.c. Director of statistics from 04.14.1899 to 7.09.1899 year

1899-1903 director Vassil Dyustabanov statistics from 7.09.1899 to 4.22.1903 year

1903 Kiril Popov managing Directorate statistics from 05.23.1903 to 2.07.1903 year

1903-1908 Vladimir Shishmanov a.c. Director of statistics from 2.07.1903 to 7.19.1908 year

1903-1908 Director Peter Germanov statistics from 07.19.1903 to 01.27.1908 year

1908-1927 Director Kiril Popov (then in 1910 Chief) statistics from 28.01.1908 to 6.05.1927 year in the period from 1.06.1917 to 1.21.1919 year GSK is managed by Nencho Mikhailov

1927-1931 Stefan Dimitrov managing the Directorate General of statistics from 7.05.1927 to 9.15.1931 year

1931-1933 Nencho Mikhailov Managing General Directorate of statistics from 15.09.1931 to 9.08.1933 year

1933-1934 Prokopi Kiranov chief of statistics from 9.08.1933 to June 1934

1934-1937 Slavcho Zagorov Chief statistics from June 1934 to 1937

1937-1943 Penko Vajarov a.c. Chief statistics from 1937 to the end of 1943

1944 Yani Grudev a.c. Chief statistics from early 1944 until 8.09.1944 year

1944-1946 Prokopi Kiranov chief of statistics from 9.09.1944 until the end of 1946

1947-1949 Kiril Lazarov Chief statistics from the beginning of 1947 to 8/20/1949 Year

1949-1950 Kiril Vladimirov a.c. Chief statistics from 20.08.1949 to 31.12.1950 year

1951-1952 Slav Georgiev Karaslavov deputy. PDK chairman and director of the statistics from 1.01.1951 to 6.10.1952 year

1952-1953 Rusi Rusev Penev Director General of statistics from 11.06.1952 to 1.02.1953 year

1953-1961 Evgeni Mateev chief of statistics, then chairman of the Central Statistical Office on 2.02.1953 by the end of 1961

1961-1971 Stefan Stanev chairman of the Central Statistical Office (then government information) by the end of 1961 to July 1971

1971-1976 Dano Balevski Head of the Central Statistical Office under the Ministry of Information and Communications from July 1971 to June 1976

1976-1977 Stefan Stanev Chairman of the Central Statistical Council (then the Committee for a unified system of social information) from June 1976 to November 1977

1977-1984 Dano Balevski Chairman of the ECCI from November 1977 to January 1984

1984-1987 Veselin Nikiforov chairman of the Committee on Essie from 01.11.1984 to 21.02.1986 year, Chairman of the Central Statistical Office (TSSU) to 01/26/1987 Year

1987-1991 Stanoi Tasev chairman of the Central Statistical Office (TSSU) from 01/26/1987 to 07/19/1991 year

1991-1998 Zachary Karanfilov Chairman of the National Statistical Institute (NSI) from 07.19.1991 to 05.20.1998 year

1998-2007 Alexander Hadjiiski Chairman of the National Statistical Institute (NSI) from 20.05.1998 to 27.04.2007 year

2007-2008 Stoyan Tsvetkov, Chairman of the National Statistical Institute (NSI) from 27.04.2007 to 25.01.2008 year

2008-2012 Mariana Kotzeva Chairman of the National Statistical Institute (NSI) from 25.01.2008 to 21.04.2012 year

2012-2014 Renetta Indjova Chairman of the National Statistical Institute (NSI) from 21.03.2012 to 04.25.2014 year

2014 Sergey Tsvetarsky Acting by 04.25.2014 and since 06.11.2014 years - Chairman of the National Statistical Institute.

See also 
 Demographics of Bulgaria
 List of national and international statistical services

References

External links 
 Official website:
 www.NSI.bg 
 www.NSI.bg/en 

Government agencies of Bulgaria
Bulgaria
Organizations based in Sofia
1880 establishments in Bulgaria